Enyalioides anisolepis the rough-scaled woodlizard, is a species of lizards in the family Hoplocercidae. It is known from the Amazonian slopes of the Andes in southern Ecuador and northern Peru. It differs from its congeneric species by possessing scattered, projecting large scales on its dorsum, flanks, and hind limbs; a well-developed vertebral crest, with vertebrals on its neck being about three times in size compared to those between the animal's hind limbs.

References

Enyalioides
Lizards of South America
Reptiles of Ecuador
Reptiles of Peru
Reptiles described in 2015
Taxa named by Omar Torres-Carvajal
Taxa named by Pablo J. Venegas
Taxa named by Kevin de Queiroz